Alexandra Paige Holden (born April 30, 1977) is an American actress. Her credits include films such as Drop Dead Gorgeous (1999), Sugar & Spice (2001) and The Hot Chick (2002), and recurring roles in the television series Friends, Ally McBeal, Friday Night Lights, Franklin & Bash, and Rizzoli & Isles. She is also known for her roles in the horror films Wishcraft (2002) and Dead End (2003).

Early life
Holden was born April 30, 1977, in Northfield, Rice County, Minnesota, daughter of Barry Holden and wife Kristi. Holden is of Scandinavian descent.

Career 
She made her feature film debut in the 1997 drama The Last Time I Committed Suicide. Subsequent film roles include: In & Out (1997), Drop Dead Gorgeous (1999), Sugar & Spice (2001), The Hot Chick (2002), and In a World... (2013). She also starred in the horror films Wishcraft (2002), Dead End, (2003), Dark Reel (2008), and Lovely Molly (2012).

On television, Holden had a recurring role in the sixth season of Friends as Elizabeth Stevens, a student who dates Ross Geller (David Schwimmer) (2000), and has had recurring roles in Ally McBeal (2001), Friday Night Lights (2007), Franklin & Bash (2011), and Rizzoli & Isles (2012–14). Other television credits include: Six Feet Under, Tru Calling, Grey's Anatomy, Private Practice, Cold Case, The Mentalist, Covert Affairs, Bones, NCIS, and CSI. She also appeared in the critically acclaimed miniseries Uprising (2001).

In 1997, Holden appeared in Aerosmith's "Hole in My Soul" music video.

Personal life 
On December 10, 1997, she married actor Johnny Strong, but they have since divorced.

Filmography

Film

Television

References

External links

 
 
 Alexandra Holden UK (British Site)

1977 births
Actresses from Minnesota
American film actresses
American television actresses
Living people
People from Northfield, Minnesota
20th-century American actresses
21st-century American actresses
American people of Norwegian descent